Kush-Yelga (Quşyılğa) is a rural locality (a village) in Tuzlukushevsky Selsoviet, Belebeyevsky District, Bashkortostan, Russia. The population was 37 as of 2010. There is 1 street.

Geography 
Kush-Yelga is located 16 km north of Belebey (the district's administrative centre) by road. Kain-Yelga is the nearest rural locality.

References 

Rural localities in Belebeyevsky District